359th may refer to:

359th Bombardment Squadron, United States Air Force unit
359th Fighter Group, unit of the Kentucky Air National Guard, stationed at Louisville Air National Guard Base, Kentucky
359th Fighter Squadron, unit of the Tennessee Air National Guard 164th Airlift Wing
359th Infantry Division (Wehrmacht), German infantry division in World War II
359th Siege Battery, Royal Garrison Artillery, established under the Glamorgan Royal Garrison Artillery in Lavernock in 1917
359th Infantry Regiment, a unit of the United States Army

See also
359 (number)
359, the year 359 (CCCLIX) of the Julian calendar
359 BC